The Rarawai–Kavanagasau Light Railway was a  long narrow gauge railway on Fiji.

Operation 

The operation started in December 1914 with free, twice-weekly, return passenger train services and weekly public goods trains, which transported pipes for the manganese mines as well as agricultural produce such as potatoes, onions, rice, maize, and other food. Transport of cattle started in the early 1950s.

The section of the Kavanagasau–Rarawai tramline from Kavanagasau to Baitiri behind Navisabasaba village, at the boundary of Cuvu and Lomawai sectors, about 4.5 kilometres from the Intercontinental Hotel towards Nadi was closed on 7 August 2009 due to the significant decline in the production of cane in the Cuvu and Olosara sectors and cane from these areas being transportable by lorry to the Lautoka Mill.

Rolling stock

Locomotives 
The Hudswell Clarke 0-6-0 locomotive with works number 972 of 1912 named Fiji (Colonial Sugar Refining Co. No. 11) and a Hudswell Clarke 0-4-0ST with works number 1056 of 1914 (Colonial Sugar Refining Co. No. 19) are preserved at Statfold Barn Railway.

Carriages 

Two second class passenger carriages and a brake van were built in 1914 by Clyde Engineering in Granville, Australia for Rarawai–Kavanagasau Light Railway. One of the carriages is now at the Ferrymead 2ft Railway in a partially disassembled state.

External links 
 The Railways of Fiji. The Development of Railways in the South Pacific. In: Railway Wonders of the World.
 Railways of Fiji, Rarawai-Kavanagasau Light Railway, as seen in October 2007

References 

2 ft gauge railways in Fiji
Standard gauge railways
Defunct railroads
Fiji